The 1973 Western Michigan Broncos football team represented Western Michigan University in the Mid-American Conference (MAC) during the 1973 NCAA Division I football season.  In their 10th season under head coach Bill Doolittle, the Broncos compiled a 6–5 record (1–4 against MAC opponents), finished in a tie for fifth place in the MAC, and were outscored by their opponents, 218 to 190.  The team played its home games at Waldo Stadium in Kalamazoo, Michigan.

The team's statistical leaders included Paul Jorgensen with 718 passing yards and 476 rushing yards and Ted Forrest with 282 receiving yards. Fullback Larry Cates and linebacker Dominic Riggio were the team captains.  For the second consecutive year, Riggio received the team's most outstanding player award.

Schedule

References

Western Michigan
Western Michigan Broncos football seasons
Western Michigan Broncos football